(literally "East settlement") is the term for the Early Medieval and High Medieval migration-period when ethnic Germans moved into the territories in the eastern part of Francia, East Francia, and the Holy Roman Empire (that Germans had already conquered) and beyond; and the consequences for settlement development and social structures in the areas of immigration.

In a pan-European intensification process from the Carolingian-Anglo-Saxon core countries to the periphery of the continent, societies progressed in culture, religion, law and administration, trade and agriculture.

The majority of  settlers moved individually, in independent efforts, in multiple stages and on different routes - there existed no imperial colonization policy, central planning or movement organization. Many settlers were encouraged and invited by the Slavic princes and regional lords.

Smaller groups of migrants first moved to the east during the early Middle Ages. Larger treks of settlers, which included scholars, monks, missionaries, craftsmen and artisans, often invited, in numbers unverifiable, first moved eastwards during the mid-12th century. The  is considered to have been a purely Medieval event as it ended in the beginning of the 14th century. The legal, cultural, linguistic, religious and economic changes caused by the movement had a profound influence on the history of Eastern Central Europe between the Baltic Sea and the Carpathians until the 20th century.

After World War I (1914-1918), the fact that  Germany and Austria lost part of their territories in the East appeared as a counterpoint to  because some of the Germans in the East became foreign citizens when their homes were no longer part of Germany and Austria. The Germans in the East outside Germany and Austria were not expelled and the regions that Germany and Austria lost in the East were dominated by non-German peoples, so the German loss here was not as severe as after World War II.

In and after World War II (1944-1950), Germans were driven out and deported to rump Germany from the East and their language and culture were lost in most areas (including the  German-dominated lands which Germany lost after this war) in which German people had settled during the Ostsiedlung; except part of Eastern Austria and especially Eastern Germany.

Early medieval Central Europe
During the 4th and 5th centuries, in what is known as the Migration Period, Germanic peoples (ancient Germans) seized control of the decaying Western Roman Empire in the South and established new kingdoms within it. Meanwhile, formerly Germanic areas in Eastern Europe and present-day Eastern Germany, were settled by Slavs.

Under Carolingian rule 

Charlemagne, ruler of the Carolingian Empire of Francia, which was founded by Franks (a Germanic people), under whom most of Western and Central continental Europe had been united during the 8th and 9th centuries, created numerous border territories, so called marches, where a substantial portion of the  would later take place. The territories (from north to south):
 the Danish March (south of the Danevirke fortifications, between the Eider and Schlei), against the Danes and Jutes
 the Saxon Eastern March or Nordalbingen March between the Eider and Elbe in what is now Holstein against the Obotrites
 the Thuringian or Sorbian March on the Saale, against the Sorbs dwelling behind the 
 the Franconian march in what is now Upper Franconia, against the Czechs
 the Avar March between the Enns and the Vienna Woods (the later Austrian March), against the Avars
 the March of Pannonia east of Vienna (divided into Upper and Lower)
 the Carantanian march
 the Friulian march

The tribes that populated these marches were generally unreliable allies of the Empire, and successor kings led numerous, yet not always successful, military campaigns to maintain their authority.

In 843 the Carolingian Empire, was partitioned into three independent kingdoms as a result of dissent among Charlemagne's three grandsons over the continuation of the custom of partible inheritance or the introduction of primogeniture.

East Francia and Holy Roman Empire 

Louis the German inherited the eastern territories, East Francia, that included all lands east of the Rhine river and to the north of Italy, which roughly corresponded with the territories of the German stem duchies, that formed a federation under the first king Henry the Fowler (919 to 936). The Slavs living within the reach of East Francia (since 962 C.E. the Holy Roman Empire), collectively called Wends or "Elbe Slavs", seldom formed larger political entities. They rather constituted various small tribes, settling as far west as to a line from the Eastern Alps and Bohemia to the Saale and Elbe rivers. As the East Frankish kingdom expanded, various Wendish tribes, that were conquered or allied with the Eastern Franks, such as the Obotrites, aided the Franks in defeating the West Germanic Saxons. The Carolingian tradition of setting up marches at the periphery of the empire would be continued by the East Frankish and Holy Roman Empire's kings during the 11th and 12th centuries.

Under the rule of King Louis the German and Arnulf of Carinthia, the first groups of civilian Catholic settlers were led by Franks and Bavarii to the lands of Pannonia (present-day Burgenland, Hungary, Slovakia and Slovenia).

In a series of punitive actions, large territories in the northeast between the Elbe, Saale, Naab rivers in the west and the Oder, Bober, Kwisa and Vltava rivers in the east were conquered (see also: Battle on the Raxa), and border marches were established in these areas. Fortifications were occupied and new castles built, reinforced by military units to exert military control and collect tributes. No civilian settlers occupied these lands. Christianization was limited to the establishment of mission dioceses such as Lübeck, Brandenburg or Havelberg. The development of a Parish church system only took place after the settlement of German colonists, beginning in the 2nd half of the 12th century. Control over areas that had already been conquered was repeatedly lost. The Slavic revolt of 983 and an uprising of the Obotrites in 1066 had particularly serious consequences.

Slavic revolt of 983

In 983, the Polabian Slavs in the Billung and Northern Marches, stretching from the Elbe river to the Baltic Sea succeeded in a rebellion against the political rule and Christian mission of the recently established Holy Roman Empire. In spite of their new-won independence, the Obotrites, Rani, Liutizian and Hevelli tribes were soon faced with internal struggles and warfare as well as raids from the newly constituted and expanding Piast dynasty (the early Polish) state from the east, Denmark from the north and the Empire from the west, eager to reestablish her marches. The area remained under rule of the Polabian tribes and uncolonized and unchristianized into the 12th century.

Eastern marches of East Francia and Holy Roman Empire

The territories (from north to south):
 the Billung March on the Baltic Sea, stretching approximately from Groswin to Schleswig
  (march of Gero), a precursor of the Saxon Eastern March, later divided into smaller marches (the Northern March, which later was reestablished as Margraviate of Brandenburg; the March of Lusatia and the Margravate of Meissen in what is now Saxony; the March of Zeitz; the March of Merseburg; the Milzener March around Bautzen)
 Austrian March (the "Eastern March" or "Bavarian Eastern March" in what is now lower Austria)
 the Carantania or March of Styria
 the Drau March (Maribor and Ptuj)
 the Sann March (Celje)

12th century 

A call for a crusade against the Wends in 1108, probably coming from a Flemish clerk in the circles of the archbishop of Magdeburg,  which included the prospect of profitable land gains for new settlers, had no noticeable effect and resulted in neither a military campaign nor a movement of settlers into the area.

Holstein and Pomerania 

Since 1124 the first Flemish and Dutch colonists settled south of the Eider river, followed by the conquest of the land of the Wagri in 1139, the founding of Lübeck in 1143 and the call by Count Adolf II of Schauenburg to settle in Eastern Holstein in the same year.

Weakened by ongoing internal conflicts and constant warfare, the independent Wendish territories finally lost the capacity to provide effective military resistance. From 1119 to 1123, Pomerania invaded and subdued the northeastern parts of the Lutici lands. In 1124 and 1128, Wartislaw I, Duke of Pomerania, at that time a vassal of Poland, invited bishop Otto of Bamberg to Christianize the Pomeranians and Liutizians of his duchy. In 1147, as a campaign of the Northern Crusades, the Wendish Crusade was mounted in the Duchy of Saxony to retake the marches lost in 983. The crusaders also headed for Pomeranian Demmin and Szczecin (Stettin), despite these areas having already been successfully Christianized.

Brandenburg and Mecklenburg 

After the Wendish crusade, Albert the Bear was able to establish and expand the Margraviate of Brandenburg in 1157 on approximately the territory of the former Northern March, which since 983 had been controlled by the Hevelli and Lutici tribes. The Bishopric of Havelberg, that had been occupied by revolting Lutici tribes was reestablished to Christianize the Wends.

In 1164, after Saxon duke Henry the Lion finally defeated rebellious Obotrites and Pomeranian dukes in the Battle of Verchen.  The Pomeranian duchies of Demmin and Stettin became Saxon fiefs, as well as the Obodrite territories, which became Mecklenburg, named after the Obotrites residential capital, Mecklenburg Castle. After Henry the Lion lost his internal struggle with Emperor Frederick I, Mecklenburg and Pomerania became fiefs of the Holy Roman Empire in 1181.

Saxon eastern marches 
The Sorbian March east of the Saale river was established in the 9th century. King Otto I designated a larger area – the Saxon Eastern March – in 937, that encompassed the territory between the Elbe, the Oder and the Peene rivers. Governed by Margrave Gero, it is also referred to as Marca Geronis. After Gero's death in 965, the march was divided in smaller sectors: Northern March, Lusatian March, Margraviate of Meissen, and March of Zeitz. The march was populated by various West Slavic tribes, the largest being Polabian Slavs tribes in the north and Sorbian tribes in the south.

The Margravate of Meissen and Transylvania were populated by German settlers, beginning in the 12th century. From the end of the 12th century onwards, monasteries and cities were established in Pomerania, Brandenburg, Silesia, Bohemia, Moravia and eastern Austria. In the Baltics, the Teutonic Order founded a crusader state in the beginning of the 13th century.

Livonian Confederation 

 (Land of Mary) was the official name for Medieval Livonia or Old Livonia which was formed in the aftermath of the Livonian Crusade in the territories comprising present day Estonia and Latvia. It was established on February 2, 1207  as a principality of the Holy Roman Empire and proclaimed by Pope Innocent III in 1215 as a subject to the Holy See.

Medieval Livonia was intermittently ruled first by the Livonian Brothers of the Sword, since 1237 by a semi-autonomous branch of the Teutonic Order called the Livonian Order and the Catholic Church. The nominal head of Terra Mariana as well as the city of Riga was the Archbishop of Riga as the apex of the ecclesiastical hierarchy.

In 1561, during the Livonian War,  ceased to exist. Its northern parts were ceded to the Swedish Empire and formed into the Duchy of Estonia, its southern territories became part of the Grand Duchy of Lithuania — and thus eventually of the Polish–Lithuanian Commonwealth as the Duchy of Livonia and Duchy of Courland and Semigallia. The island of Saaremaa became part of Denmark.

Social and demographic background
Political and military events were greatly influenced by a massive population increase throughout Europe in the High Middle Ages. From the 11th to the 13th centuries, the population in the kingdom of Germany increased from about four to twelve million inhabitants. During this time, the High Medieval Landesausbau (inland colonization) took place, when arable land was largely expanded at the expense of forested areas. Although new land was won and numerous settlements created, demands could not be absorbed. Another factor was a surplus of offspring of the nobility who were not entitled to inheritance, but after the success of the first crusade, took their chances of acquiring new lands in the peripheral regions of the Empire.

There is no doubt that there were "rather numerous German settlers" in Eastern Central who were responsible for bringing German law in the earliest stages of the colonization. Other settlers included Walloons, Jews, Dutch, Flemish, and later Poles, especially in the territory of modern Ukraine.

The migration of the Walser in the territory of present-day Switzerland to areas that had formerly been inhabited by Romans. The Walser settlers left their homes in Valais and founded villages in the uplands of the Alp valleys (in the north of Italy and in the Grisons).

Technical and agricultural development 

The Medieval Warm Period, which began in the 11th century resulted in higher average temperatures in Central Europe.
Additional technical progress in agriculture, for example through the construction of mills, Three-field farming and increased cultivation of grain (graining) led to general population increase.

The new settlers not only brought their customs and language with them, but also new technical skills and equipment that were adapted within a few decades, especially in agriculture and crafts. These included:

The amount of cultivated land increased as large forested areas were cleared. The extent of land increase differed by region. In Silesia it had doubled (16% of the total area) by the beginning of the 11th century, 30% in the 16th century and the highest increase rates in the 14th century, the total area of arable land increased seven - to twentyfold in many Silesian regions during the Ostsiedlung.

Parallel to agricultural innovations new forms of farm layout and settlement structuring (division and classification of land) were introduced. Farmland was divided into , (English hides) and larger villages replaced the previously dominant type of small villages consisting of four to eight farms as a complete transformation of the previous settlement structure occurred. The cultural landscape of East Central Europe formed by the medieval settlement processes essentially prevails until today.

Dutch settlers and hydraulic engineering 

Flemish and Dutch settlers were among the first to immigrate to Mecklenburg at the beginning of the 12th century. In the following years, they moved further east to Pomerania and Silesia and in the south to Hungary, motivated by the lack of settlement areas in their already largely developed home areas and several flood disasters and famines.

Experienced and skilled hydraulic engineers, they were in high demand at the settlements of the as yet undeveloped areas east of the Elbe. The land was drained by creating a network-like structure of smaller drainage ditches that drained the water in main ditches. Roads connecting the settlers' individual farms ran along these main trenches.

Dutch settlers were recruited by the local rulers in large numbers, especially during the second half of the 12th century. In 1159/60, for example, Albert the Bear granted Dutch settlers the right to take possession of former Slavic settlements. The preacher Helmold of Bosau reported on this in his Slavic chronicle: “Finally, when the Slavs were gradually dispersing, he (Albrecht) sent to Utrecht and the Rhine region, and also to those who live by the ocean, who under the power of the sea had suffered, the Dutch, Zealanders and Flemings, where he attracted a lot of people and let them live in the castles and villages of the Slavs."

Agricultural implements 

The Slavs used plows and agricultural implements before the arrival of western immigrants. The oldest meaningful reference to this can be found in a Slavic chronicle, in which the use of a plow as an areal measurement is mentioned.

In the 12th and 13th century documents the Ard without a moldboard is mentioned. It tear opens the soil and spreads the soil to both sides without turning it. It is therefore particularly suitable for light and sandy subsoil. In the mid 13th century, the Three-field system was introduced east of the Elbe. This new cultivation method required the use of the heavy moldboard plow that digs up the earth deeply and turns it around in a single operation.

The different modes of operation of the two devices also had an impact on the shape and size of the cultivation areas. The fields worked with the ard had about the same field length and width and a square base. Long fields with a rectangular base were much more suitable for the moldboard plow, as the heavy implements had to be turned less often. Planting and cultivation of oats and rye was promoted and soon these cereals became the most important type of grain. Farmers who used moldboard plows were required to pay double tax fees.

Pottery 

Potters were among the first group of artisans who also settled in the rural areas. Typical Slavic ceramics were the Flat-bottom vessels. With the influx of western settlers, new vessel shapes such as the rounded jar were introduced, inclusive hard-fired processes, that improved ceramics quality. This type of ceramics, known as Hard Grayware, became widespread east of the Elbe by the end of the 12th century. It was manufactured extensively in Pomerania by the 13th century, when more advanced manufacturing methods, such as the tunnel kiln, enabled the mass production of ceramic household goods. The demand for household goods such as pots, jugs, jugs and bowls, which had previously been made of wood, increased steadily and promoted the development of new sales markets.

During the 13th century, glazed ceramics were introduced and the import of stoneware increased. The transfer of technology and knowledge affected the way of life of old and new settlers in a variety of ways and, in addition to innovations in agriculture and handicrafts, also included other areas, such as weapons technology, documents and coins.

Architecture 

The Slavic population (Sorbs), who lived east of the Elbe, primarily built log houses, which had proven suitable for the regional climates and wood was plentiful in the continental regions. The German settlers, mainly from Franconia and Thuringia, who advanced into the area in the 13th century, brought with them the half-timbering style, which was already known to the Germanic peoples, as a wood-saving, solid and stable construction method, that allowed multi-storey buildings. A combination of the two construction methods was difficult because the horizontally stacked wood of the log room expands differently in height than the vertical posts of the framework. The result was the new type of half-timbered house with a timber frame around the ground floor block, capable to support a second floor, which was made of half-timber.

Population and settlement 

The Ostsiedlung followed an immediate rapid population growth throughout Central and Eastern Europe. During the 12th and 13th centuries, the population density increased considerably. The increase was due to the influx of settlers on the one hand and an increase in indigenous populations after the colonization on the other hand. Settlement was the primary reason for the increase e.g. in the areas east of the Oder, the Duchy of Pomerania, western Greater Poland, Silesia, Austria, Moravia, Prussia and Transylvania, while in the larger part of Central and Eastern Europe indigenous populations were responsible for the growth. Author Piskorski wrote that "insofar as it is possible to draw conclusions from the less than rich medieval source material, it appears that at least in some East Central European territories the population increased significantly. It is however possible to contest to what extent this was a direct result of migration and how far it was due to increased agricultural productivity and the gathering pace of urbanization." In contrast to Western Europe, this increased population was largely spared by the 14th-century Black Death pandemic.

With the German settlers new systems of taxation arrived. While the existing Wendish tithe was a fixed tax depending on village size, the German tithe depended on the actual crop yield. Thus higher taxes were collected from the settlers than from the Wends, although settlers were partly exempted from tax payments during the first years after settlement establishment.

Urban development and city foundations

There already existed Slavic castle towns, in which merchant quarters formed suburbs at fortified strongholds (grads). Wendish-Scandinavian merchants founded manufacturing and trading settlements (emporia) at the Baltic coast. Large cities included Szczecin which reached 9,000 inhabitants, Kraków which was the capital of the state of Piast Poland and Wrocław, already under civil and religious administration and centers of power. However, they experienced substantial growth since the end of the 12th century through new settlers and expansion. The foundation of a bishopric, for example in Havelberg, would lead to the development of a town, although cities were also founded out of nowhere, such as Neubrandenburg. Characteristic of the founding cities are geometrical or rasterized floor plans with main streets, intersecting axes and a central market place. Different settlement phases are reflected in twin cities names such as New town or Old town.

The rapid increase in the number of towns led to an "urbanization of East Central Europe". The new towns differed from their predecessors in:
 The introduction of German town law, resulting in far-reaching administrative and judicial rights for the towns. The townspeople were personally free, enjoyed far-reaching property rights and were subject to the town's own jurisdiction only. The privileges granted to the towns were copied, sometimes with minor changes, from the legal charters of the (Lübeck Law in 33 towns at the southern coast of the Baltic Sea), the Magdeburg Law in Brandenburg, areas of modern Saxony, Lusatia, Silesia, northern Bohemia, northern Moravia and the Teutonic Order state, the Nuremberg Law in southwestern Bohemia, the Brünn Law (Brno) in Moravia, based on the charter of Vienna), the Iglau Law (Jihlava) in Bohemian and Moravian mining areas. Besides these basic town laws, several adapted town charters.
 The introduction of permanent markets. As previously, markets were held only periodically, townspeople were now free to trade and marketplaces became a central feature of the new towns.
 Layout: The new towns were planned towns as their layout was usually rectangular.

City laws and grants 
The granting of city rights played an important role in attracting German settlers. The town charter privileged the new residents and existing suburban settlements with a market were given formal town charter and then rebuilt or expanded. Even small settlements inhabited by native people would eventually be granted these new rights. Regardless of existing suburban settlements, locators were commissioned to establish completely new cities, as the goal was to attract as many people as possible in order to create new, flourishing population centers.

Expansion of the German city laws 

Among the many different German city laws, the Magdeburg law and the Lübeck law played the greatest role in the new settlements as they served, often in more or less modified form, as models for most cities. Other city rights that were of regional importance include the. Nuremberg law, the Mecklenburg law and the Iglau law. The Lübeck law of 1188 served in the 13th and 14th centuries as the model for around 100 cities in the entire Baltic Sea trading area. Around 350,000 people lived under Lübeck law in the early 15th century. The Magdeburg law, which has its origins in the privileges granted by Archbishop Wichmann of Magdeburg, first spread into Brandenburg, Saxony and Lusatia. Laws based on the Magdeburg model (for example the Kulmer law and Neumarkt law) were introduced in Silesia, Poland, the State of the Teutonic Order, Bohemia and Moravia and beyond.

Religious changes 

The pagan Wends had been the target of Christianization attempts before the beginning of the Ostsiedlung, since the government of emperor Otto I and the establishment of dioceses east of the Elbe. The Slav uprising of 983 put an end to these efforts for almost 200 years. In contrast to the Czechs and Poles who had been Christianized before the turn of the millennium, the conversion attempts of the Elbe Slavs initially accompanied by violence. The arrival of new settlers from around 1150 on led to a civil Christianization of the areas between the Elbe and Oder. The new settlers first built wooden and later field stone parish churches in their villages. Some places of worship, such as the St. Mary in Brandenburg, and the Lehnin Abbey, were built on pagan shrines. The Cistercians, who had been assigned a prominent role by church authorities, combined the spread of faith and settlement development. Their monasteries with extensive international connections played a vital role in the development of the communities.

Settlers

The majority of the settlers were Germans of the Holy Roman Empire. Significant numbers of Dutch settlers participated, particularly in the early 12th century in the area surrounding the Middle Elbe River. To a lesser extent Danes, Scots or local Wends and (French-speaking) Walloons participated as well. Among the settlers were landless children of noble families who could not inherit property.

Besides the marches, adjacent to the Empire, Germans settled in areas farther east, such as the Carpathians, Transylvania, and along the Gulf of Riga. Settlers were invited by local secular rulers, such as dukes, counts, margraves, princes and (only in a few cases due to the weakening central power) the king. The sovereigns in East Central Europe owned large territories, of which only small portions were arable, which generated very little income. The lords offered considerable privileges to new settlers from the Empire. Starting in the border marks, the princes invited people from the Empire by granting them land ownership and improved legal status, binding duties and the inheritance of the farm. The landowners eventually benefited from these rather generous conditions for the farmers, and generated income from the land that had previously been fallow.

Most sovereigns transferred the specific recruitment of settlers, the distribution of the land and the establishment of the settlements to so-called  (allocator of land). These men, who usually came from the lower nobility or the urban bourgeoisie, organized the settlement trains, that included advertising, equipment and transport, land clearing and preparation of the settlements. Locator contracts settled rights and obligations of the locators and the new settlers.

Towns were founded and granted German town law. The agricultural, legal, administrative, and technical methods of the immigrants, as well as their successful Christianization of the native inhabitants, led to a gradual transformation of the settlement areas, as Slavic communities adopted German culture. German cultural and linguistic influence lasted in some of these areas right up to the present day.

In the mid 14th century, the migration process slowed considerably as a result of the Black Death. The population probably decreased by that time and economically marginal settlements were left, in particular at the coast of Pomerania and Western Prussia. Only a century later, local Slavic leaders of Pomerania, Western Prussia and Silesia invited German settlers again.

Assimilation
Colonization was the pretext for assimilation processes that lasted centuries. Assimilation occurred in both directions – depending on the region and the majority population, Slavic and German settlers mutually assimilated each other.

Germans

The Polonization process of German settlers in Kraków and Poznań lasted about two centuries. The community could only continue its isolated position with a continuation of newcomers from German lands. The Sorbs also assimilated German settlers, yet at the same time, small Sorbic communities were themselves assimilated by the surrounding German-speaking population. Many Central and Eastern European towns developed into multi-ethnic melting pots.

Treatment, involvement and traces of the Wends

Although Slavic population density was generally not very high compared to the Empire and had, as a result of the extensive warfare during the 10th to 12th centuries, even further declined, some settlement centers maintained their Wendish populations to varying degrees, resisting assimilation for a long time.

In the territories of Pomerania and Silesia, German migrants did not settle in the old Wendish villages and set up new ones on grounds allotted to them by the Slavic nobility and the monastic clergy. In the marches west of the Oder, the Wends were occasionally driven out and the villages rebuilt by settlers. The new villages would nevertheless keep their former Slavic names. In the case of the village  in Mecklenburg, the evicted Wendish inhabitants repeatedly invaded their former village, hindering a resettlement.

In the Sorbian March the situation was again different as the area and in particular Upper Lusatia is situated close to Bohemia, ruled by a Slavic dynasty, a loyal and powerful duchy of the Empire. In this environment, German feudal lords often cooperated with the Slavic inhabitants. Wiprecht of Groitzsch, a prominent figure during the early German migration period only acquired local power through the marriage to a Slavic noblewoman and the support of the Bohemian king. German-Slavic relations were generally good, while relations between Slavic-governed Bohemia and Slavic-governed Poland were marred by constant struggle.

Rather, the Wends were subject to a low taxation mode and thus not as profitable as new settlers. Even though the majority of the settlers were Germans (Franks and Bavarians in the South, and Saxons and Flemings in the North), Wends and other tribes also participated in the settlement. New settlers were not chosen just because of their ethnicity, a concept unknown in the Middle Ages, but because of their manpower and agricultural and technical know-how.

Most of the Wends were gradually assimilated. However, in isolated rural areas where Wends constituted a substantial part of the population, they continued their culture. These were the Drevani Polabians of the Wendland east of the Lüneburg Heath, the Jabelheide Drevani of southern Mecklenburg, the Slovincians and Kashubs of Eastern Pomerania, and the Sorbs of Lusatia. Lusatia was inhabited by a large population of Sorbs until the end of the 19th century as linguistic assimilation occurred in a relatively short time.

Language exchange 
The Ostsiedlung caused the adoption of loan words, foreign words and loan translations among the German and the Slavic languages. Direct contact between Germans and Slavs caused direct language exchange of language elements due to the bilingualism of people or the spatial proximity of the speakers of the respective language. Remote contact took place during trade travels or political embassies.

The oldest adoption of naming units dates back to Proto-Germanic and Proto-Slavic. The original Slavic word  can be found in almost all Slavic languages. German was mainly used to convey words in Slavic languages that related to handicraft, politics, agriculture and nutrition. This includes Old High German , Middle High German ,  (brick), that resulted from the sound shift of the Latin tegula. An example of borrowing from Slavic into Germanic usage is the word for border. In Middle High German called , which is a borrowing of the old Czech word  or the Polish word . City names are also affected by language exchange, sound shifting and the Slavic second palatalization. Due to the intensive language contact, idioms were also transmitted.

Names of localities and settlements

As Slavic and Wendish locality names were widely adopted, they represent, in adapted and further developed form, a very high proportion of East German toponyms and place names. These are recognizable at word endings, such as -ow (Germanized , as in Spandau), -vitz or -witz and sometimes -in. The name of the settler's place of origin (example: Lichtervelde in Flanders) could also become part of the place name.

In German-speaking areas most inherited surnames were formed only after the  period, and many German surnames are in fact Germanized Wendish placenames.

The former ethnic variety of German and Slavic toponyms was discontinued by the Eastern European republics after World War II. Villages and towns were renamed in Slavic only. Memory of the history of German colonization was no longer appreciated.

Conflicts
The colonization sometimes brought ethnic conflict. Local populations, particularly in the towns, sometimes had negative attitudes toward newcomers, particularly those who did not speak the local language, while natives were sometimes expelled at the regional level.

End of migration 
There is no clear cause nor a definite end point in time of the Ostsiedlung. However, a slowdown in the settlement movement can be observed after the year 1300 and in the 14th century only a few new settlements with the participation of German-speaking colonists were founded. An explanation for the end of the Ostsiedlung must include various factors without being able to clearly weigh or differentiate between them. The deterioration of the climate from around 1300 as the beginning of the "Little Ice Age", the agricultural crisis that began in the mid 14th century. In the wake of the demographic slump caused by the 1347 Plague, profound devastation processes have taken place. If a clear connection could be established here, the end of the Ostsiedlung would be understood as part of the crisis of the 14th century.

In the 19th century, recognition of this complex phenomenon coupled with the rise of nationalism. This led to a largely unhistoric ethnically inspired nationalist reinterpretation of the medieval process.

The German settlement processes in Pomerania did not follow any kind of ideology, nor did the other migratory movements. Rather, the German settlement in Pomerania was shaped exclusively by practical requirements...The national historiography that established itself around the middle of the 19th century retrospectively constructed a Slavic-Germanic contrast in the  process of the High Middle Ages. However, that was the ideology of the 19th century, not the Middle Ages...Settlement was to be "" ('people of whatever origin and whatever craft') which was recorded in numerous documents issued by Pomeranian dukes and Rügish princes.
-Buchholz

Legacy

The 20th century wars and nationalist policies severely altered the ethnic and cultural composition of Central and Eastern Europe. After World War I, Germans in reconstituted Poland were set under pressure to leave the Polish Corridor, the eastern part of Upper Silesia and Poznań. During World War II, the Nazis initiated the Nazi-Soviet population transfers, wiping out the old settlement areas of the Baltic Germans, the Germans in Bessarabia and others, to resettle them in the future territories in occupied Poland.

In order to press the territorial claims of Germany and to demonstrate supposed German superiority over non-Germanic peoples, whose cultural, urban and scientific achievements in that era were undermined, rejected, or presented as German.

The Potsdam Conference – the meeting between the leaders of the United States, Great Britain, and the Soviet Union – sanctioned the expulsion of Germans from Czechoslovakia, Poland and Hungary. With the Red Army's advance and Nazi Germany's defeat in 1945, the ethnic make-up of Central and Eastern and East Central Europe was radically changed, as nearly all Germans were expelled not only from all Soviet conquered German settlement areas across Central and Eastern Europe, but also from former territories of the Reich east of the Oder-Neisse line, mainly, the provinces of Silesia, East Prussia, East Brandenburg, and Pomerania. The Soviet-established People's Republic of Poland annexed the majority of the lands while the northern half of East Prussia was taken by the Soviets, becoming the Kaliningrad Oblast, an exclave of the Russian SFSR. The former German settlement areas were resettled by ethnic citizens of the respective succeeding state, (Czechs in the former Sudetenland and Poles in Silesia and Pomerania).

The Medieval colonization areas, that constituted the Eastern provinces of the modern German Empire and Austria, were inhabited estimated 30 million Germans at beginning of 20th century. The Westward withdrawal of political boundaries of Germany, first in 1919, but substantially in 1945, was followed by removal of some 15 million people, to resettle within borders of present-day Germany. Only the oldest 12th-century and partially 13th-century colonization areas remained German in language and culture, that are situated within area of the post-1945 Eastern Germany and part of Eastern Austria; in which Eastern Germany is a part of Germany, especially from German reunification on 3 October 1990.

See also

 Cultural assimilation
 German diaspora
 
 
 Barbarian invasions
 Wends
 Wendish Crusade
 Northern Crusades
 Medieval demography
 German exonyms
 Germanization
 Germanization of Poles during Partitions
 History of Germans in Russia and the Soviet Union
 Historical migration
 Josephine colonization
 Population transfer in the Soviet Union
 Polonization
 Pre-modern human migration

References

Sources
 
  
 
 
 
 
 Herrmann, 
 
 
 
 
  (unabridged facsimile of the edition published by Duncker & Humblot, Leipzig 1896)

Further reading
 Charles Higounet (1911–1988) 
 German translation: 
 Japanese translation: , by Naoki Miyajima
 Bielfeldt et al.,  Hg. Joachim Herrmann, Akademie-Verlag Berlin, 1985

Social history of the Holy Roman Empire
German diaspora in Europe
Medieval Germany
Former eastern territories of Germany
Estonia–Germany relations
Germany–Latvia relations
Germany–Lithuania relations
Estonia–Russia relations
Germany–Romania relations
History of Mecklenburg-Western Pomerania
German words and phrases
Prussian Crusade
Historical migrations
Migration Period